Skåne Northern and Eastern is one of the multi-member constituencies of the Riksdag, the national legislature of Sweden. As of the 2018 Swedish general election, Skåne Northern and Eastern elected 11 of the 349 members of the Riksdag.

Skåne Northern and Eastern contains 13 municipalities: Båstad, Ängelholm, Klippan, Hässleholm, Osby, Åstorp, Perstorp, Örkelljunga, Östra Göinge, Bromölla, Kristianstad, Tomelilla and Simrishamn.

Skåne Northern and Eastern is one of the four constituencies in Skåne County, along with Skåne Southern, Skåne Western and Malmö Municipality.

Results

2018

References

Riksdag constituencies
Skåne County